Mauritius competed at the 2020 Summer Olympics in Tokyo. Originally scheduled to take place from 24 July to 9 August 2020, the Games were postponed to 23 July to 8 August 2021, because of the COVID-19 pandemic. It was the nation's tenth consecutive appearance at the Summer Olympics.

Competitors
The following is the list of number of competitors in the Games.

Athletics

Mauritius received a universality slot from the World Athletics to send a male track and field athlete to the Olympics.

Track & road events

Badminton

Mauritius entered one badminton player into the Olympic tournament. Two-time African champion Julien Paul secured a place in the men's singles as the highest-ranked badminton player vying for qualification from his respective continent in the men's singles based on the BWF World Race to Tokyo Rankings.

Boxing

Mauritius entered two boxers into the Olympic tournament. Two-time Olympian Richarno Colin scored an outright semifinal victory to secure a spot in the men's lightweight division at the 2020 African Qualification Tournament in Diamniadio, Senegal. Rio 2016 Olympian Merven Clair completed the nation's boxing lineup by topping the list of eligible boxers from Africa in the men's welterweight division of the IOC's Boxing Task Force Rankings.

Judo

Mauritius qualified one judoka for the men's middleweight category (90 kg) at the Games. Rémi Feuillet accepted a continental berth from Africa as the nation's top-ranked judoka outside of direct qualifying position in the IJF World Ranking List of June 28, 2021.

Swimming

Mauritius received a universality invitation from FINA to send two top-ranked swimmers (one per gender) in their respective individual events to the Olympics, based on the FINA Points System of June 28, 2021.

Weightlifting

Mauritius entered one female weightlifter into the Olympic competition. Roilya Ranaivosoa topped the list of weightlifters from Africa in the women's 49 kg category based on the IWF Absolute Continental Rankings.

References

Nations at the 2020 Summer Olympics
2020
2021 in Mauritius